William Alan Thompson (born 20 January 1952) is an English former professional footballer who played as a central defender.

Career
Born in Liverpool, Thompson played for Sheffield Wednesday, Stockport County, Portland Timbers, Bradford City and Scunthorpe United.

Thompson signed for Bradford City in January 1980, having previously played in the United States with the Portland Timbers. He made 35 appearances for the club – 31 in the league, one in the FA Cup, and three in the Football League Cup. He left the club in March 1982 to sign for Scunthorpe United.

Sources

References

1952 births
Living people
English footballers
English expatriate footballers
Sheffield Wednesday F.C. players
Stockport County F.C. players
Bradford City A.F.C. players
Portland Timbers (1975–1982) players
Scunthorpe United F.C. players
Expatriate soccer players in the United States
English Football League players
North American Soccer League (1968–1984) players
Association football defenders
English expatriate sportspeople in the United States